Giovanni (Gianni) Maimeri (Varano, Varese, 1884 – Milan, 1951) was an Italian painter.

Biography
Giovanni Maimeri was self-taught and completed his training in Venice and Milan, where he studied at the studio of Leonardo Bazzaro from 1906 onwards. His meeting with Emilio Gola in 1908 was decisive in the development of his artistic research with a naturalistic approach, which focused on the impact of light on objects and on the role of colour. In 1910 he made his debut in the Esposizione di Belle Arti at the Società Permanente with subjects taken from Milan nightlife, a landscape and figures. The same themes, which he tackled repeatedly during the following years, were brought together in his first solo exhibition at the Galleria Geri in Milan, in 1918. Starting in 1923, he worked on an idea to start manufacturing paints for artistic use industrially, in collaboration with his brother Carlo, a graduate in chemical engineering. From 1929 onwards he devoted himself to views of the Milan canals presented the following year at the Giornale dell’Arte salon, which was to become a characteristic theme of his output. He was systematically excluded from the Esposizione Internazionale d’Arte della Città di Venezia and from the Mostre del Sindacato Fascista, but continued to exhibit during the 1940s at the most important private galleries in Milan and Rome.

References
 Elena Lissoni, Giovanni Maimeri, online catalogue Artgate by Fondazione Cariplo, 2010, CC BY-SA (source for the first revision of this article).

Other projects

19th-century Italian painters
Italian male painters
20th-century Italian painters
People from the Province of Varese
Painters from Milan
1884 births
1951 deaths
19th-century Italian male artists
20th-century Italian male artists